Herbert Maisch (born 10 December 1890in Nürtingen, Württemberg, died 10 October 1974 in Köln) was a German film director.

Selected filmography
 The Royal Waltz (1935)
 Boccaccio (1936)
 Love's Awakening (1936)
 Men Without a Fatherland (1937)
 Nights in Andalusia (1938)
 Nanon (1938)
 D III 88 (1939)
 Andreas Schlüter (1942)
 Music in Salzburg (1944)

References

External links
 

1890 births
1974 deaths
People from Nürtingen
Film directors from Baden-Württemberg
People from the Kingdom of Württemberg
Commanders Crosses of the Order of Merit of the Federal Republic of Germany